In the 2013–14 UD Almería season the club played in two tournaments: the La Liga and the Copa del Rey. The club returns to the top flight of Spanish football after two seasons in absence, after defeating Girona in 2013 Segunda División play-offs, on 22 June.

Players

Squad

Transfers

In

Total spending:  €30,000

Out

Total gaining:  €970,000

Player statistics

Squad Stats 

 

|-
|colspan="12"|Players on loan to other clubs:

|-
|colspan="12"|Players who have left the club after the start of the season:

|}

Top scorers

Disciplinary record

Competitions

Pre-season / Friendlies

La Liga

League table

Results summary

Results by round

Matches

Copa del Rey

References

External links

Almería
UD Almería seasons